Davide Cocco Palmieri was an Italian, Roman Catholic prelate who served as the Bishop of Malta from 1684 until 1711.

Biography
Cocco Palmieri was born in Southern Italy in March 1632. He was ordained priest of the Sovereign Military Order of Malta on February 24, 1657. Two years after Bishop Molina was transferred to another diocese in Spain, Pope Innocent XI appointed Cocco Palmieri as his successor on May 15, 1684. Cocco Palmieri was greatly esteemed by Grand Master Alof de Wignacourt. He was consecrated bishop on 4 June 1684. During his bishopric Cocco Palmieri opposed the privileges that of the Roman Inquisition. He was also known for his courage to confront the knights when they were mistaken.

Cocco Palmieri established a number of parishes in Gozo such as the parishes of Sannat, Nadur, Xagħra and Żebbuġ. The earthquake of 1693 resulted in the destruction of many buildings including the cathedral in Mdina. Thus he started to lay plans for he construction of a new cathedral. He died after 23 years as bishop on 19 September 1711.

References

1632 births
1711 deaths
Knights of Malta
18th-century Italian Roman Catholic bishops
Knights Hospitaller bishops
Bishops of Malta